Floirac Dravemont tram stop is the terminus of the southern branch of line A of the Tramway de Bordeaux. It opened on 27 February 2007, when the line was extended from La Morlette. The stop is located in the commune of Floirac and is operated by the TBC.

For most of the day on Mondays to Fridays, trams run every ten minutes between Floirac Dravemont and Bordeaux city centre. Services run less frequently in the early morning, late evenings, weekends and public holidays.

References

Bordeaux tramway stops
Tram stops in Floirac, Gironde
Railway stations in France opened in 2007